The year 2014 was a challenging year for the Chiefs rugby team as they looked for their third straight super rugby title. They won eight of their Super Rugby games and finished fifth overall on the table, and second behind the Crusaders in the New Zealand Conference. Playing the Brumbies in the qualifying finals, they had a narrow loss, losing 32-30, which ended their super rugby season.

Standings

The final standings of the 2014 Super Rugby season were:

Results

The following fixtures were released 7 October 2013.

Squad

The Chiefs squad for the 2014 Super Rugby season were:

Player statistics

The Chiefs players' appearance and scoring statistics for the 2014 Super Rugby season are:

Notes and references

External links
Official Chiefs website
Official Super Rugby website
Official Facebook page

2014
2014 in New Zealand rugby union
2014 Super Rugby season by team